COP9 signalosome complex subunit 6 is a protein that in humans is encoded by the COPS6 gene.

Function 

The protein encoded by this gene is one of the eight subunits of COP9 signalosome, a highly conserved protein complex that functions as an important regulator in multiple signaling pathways. The structure and function of COP9 signalosome is similar to that of the 19S regulatory particle of 26S proteasome. COP9 signalosome has been shown to interact with SCF-type E3 ubiquitin ligases and act as a positive regulator of E3 ubiquitin ligases. This protein belongs to translation initiation factor 3 (eIF3) superfamily. It is involved in the regulation of cell cycle and likely to be a cellular cofactor for HIV-1 accessory gene product Vpr.

Interactions 

COPS6 has been shown to interact with EIF3S6.

References

Further reading

External links